Events in the year 2017 in Namibia.

Incumbents
President: Hage Geingob
Vice President: Nickey Iyambo
Prime Minister: Saara Kuugongelwa
Chief Justice: Peter Shivute

Events
23 to 25 June – Namibia hosted the 2017 Men's African Hockey Indoor Cup of Nations

Deaths
16 January – Kerry McNamara, architect and anti-Apartheid activist (b. 1940).

9 June – Andimba Toivo ya Toivo, anti-Apartheid activist, politician and political prisoner (b. 1924)

References

 
2010s in Namibia
Years of the 21st century in Namibia
Namibia
Namibia